"Rachel in Love" is a 1987 science fiction short story by American writer Pat Murphy. It was first published in Asimov's Science Fiction.

Synopsis

When a neurologist's teenage daughter Rachel is killed, he secretly copies a recording of her personality into a chimpanzee with amplified intelligence, and teaches her sign language; however, when he dies without having told anyone that Rachel lives on, the authorities transfer her to a primatology research center.

Reception
"Rachel in Love" won the 1987 Nebula Award for Best Novelette, the 1988 Theodore Sturgeon Memorial Award, and the 1988 Locus Award for Best Novelette, and was a finalist for the 1988 Hugo Award for Best Novelette.

References

External links
Text of the story, at Science Fiction Writers of America
Audio version of the story, at Escape Pod

Nebula Award for Best Novelette-winning works
Fictional chimpanzees
Science fiction short stories
Works originally published in Asimov's Science Fiction
1987 short stories
Works by Pat Murphy (writer)
Theodore Sturgeon Award-winning works